Brian Yandrisovitz (born May 6, 1964), better known as Brian Knobbs, is an American professional wrestler best known as half of the tag team The Nasty Boys with his partner Jerry Sags.

Early life
Knobbs was born on May 6, 1964 in Allentown, Pennsylvania. He attended Whitehall High School in Whitehall Township, Pennsylvania in the Lehigh Valley region of eastern Pennsylvania. While at Whitehall High School, Knobbs befriended Jerry Sags. The two would go on to ultimately establish The Nasty Boys in 1986.

The Nasty Boys (1986-1997)

In 1986, Knobbs started his career in the American Wrestling Association, performing as the Masked Terrorist. The following year, in 1986, he formed a tag team called The Nasty Boys with partner Jerry Sags and wrestled in Memphis, Tennessee until they moved to Florida Championship Wrestling, where they won five tag team titles from 1988 through 1990. 

In 1990, the team moved to the National Wrestling Alliance (NWA)'s Jim Crockett Promotions, which had been purchased by Ted Turner and was renamed World Championship Wrestling (WCW) before The Nasty Boys left a few months later. They feuded with Rick and Scott Steiner over the WCW United States Tag Team Championship but could not defeat them. Later that year, they left for the World Wrestling Federation, where they were managed by Jimmy Hart. They won the World Tag Team Title from The Hart Foundation before feuding with and losing the title to the Legion of Doom. 

The Nasty Boys wrestled many of the WWF's top face teams, including The Rockers, The Bushwhackers, and High Energy, before turning face in 1992 to feud with Hart's Money Inc. over the tag team title, which they were unable to regain. They then left the WWF for the WCW in 1993 and were placed with manager Missy Hyatt, who led them to the WCW World Tag Team Championship. After Hyatt left as their manager, they feuded with Harlem Heat, The Blue Bloods, and the team of Dick Slater and Bunkhouse Buck. They won the tag team title a second time later in 1993, but they were defeated by Cactus Jack, and Kevin Sullivan the following year. In May 1995, they defeated Harlem Heat for their third and final WCW tag title at Slamboree in St. Petersburg, Florida but lost the belts back to Harlem Heat in a June episode of WCW WorldWide. In 1996, they were tricked by the nWo into thinking they were going to become members, but were attacked as soon as they received their shirts. Sags had been injured previously in a shoot altercation with Scott Hall and was forced to retire as a result of the injury.

Singles career (1997-present)

Following Sags' retirement, Knobbs left WCW and became a singles wrestler, feuding with Norman Smiley and defeating Bam Bam Bigelow at SuperBrawl at the Cow Palace in 2000. He went on to win the WCW Hardcore Championship three times. He lost the belt simultaneously to all three members of the boy band stable 3 Count but later regained it from them. Fit Finlay was briefly his manager as the Hardcore Soldiers with partner The Dog. Knobbs also was briefly in Jimmy Hart's The First Family. 

After leaving WCW, Knobbs returned to wrestling, including wrestling at the New Alhambra Arena in Philadelphia for Pro Wrestling Unplugged on June 16, 2007. On November 20, 2007, Knobbs and Sags reformed as The Nasty Boys, performing in a dark match at the SmackDown! tapings from Tampa, Florida to wrestle their first WWE match in years. According to reports, the match was disastrous, and the team were accused of unprofessionally working stiff with their opponents, Dave Taylor and Drew McIntyre. Knobbs and Saggs won the match.

The Nasty Boys' comeback
On January 4, 2010, The Nasty Boys appeared on Total Nonstop Action Wrestling (TNA)'s television show, TNA Impact!, and started a feud with Team 3D. On the January 21 edition of Impact!, they competed in their first match for TNA, defeating the team of Eric Young and Kevin Nash. At Against All Odds in Orlando, Florida, The Nasty Boys defeated Team 3D in a tag team match in which Jimmy Hart made his return to the company and interfered in the match on the Nasty Boys' behalf. 

On the February 25, 2010 edition of Impact!, Team 3D defeated the Nasty Boys in a tables match, when Jesse Neal interfered on Team 3D's behalf. The Nasty Boys and Hart continued their feud with Team 3D by defeating them and the returning Brother Runt, a replacement for Jesse Neal, who The Nasty Boys attacked prior to the match in a six-man tag team match. After the match, Neal attacked The Nastys and helped Team 3D throw Sags through a table. 

On March 29, 2010, The Nasty Boys were released by TNA following an incident at a TNA function where Spike executives were present. In February 2012, Knobbs was involved in an altercation with fellow wrestler New Jack with New Jack allegedly knocking Knobbs out.

Personal life
Since January 1994, Knobbs has been married to the sister of Greg Valentine's wife. The couple have one child. Knobbs is a close friend of Hulk Hogan.

In 2019, Knobbs was hospitalized with a blood infection and had surgery on one of his knees. His medical bills were paid by fans through a GoFundMe campaign. On August 10, 2021, he was hospitalized again for multiple health issues and another GoFundMe was set up for his expenses.

Other work
Knobbs has appeared in several episodes of Hogan Knows Best and Brooke Knows Best, and was an on-screen trainer for Hulk Hogan's Celebrity Championship Wrestling and Hulk Hogan's Micro Championship Wrestling. During the 2009 Major League Baseball season, Knobbs performed a "Pit Stop" on Raymond, the Tampa Bay Rays mascot. Knobbs serves as the "10th Man" for the Tampa Bay Rays. He also appeared as a panelist on the Nickelodeon children's game show Figure It Out: Wild Style in 1999, getting slimed.

Championships and accomplishments
Cauliflower Alley Club
Tag Team Award (2023) – with Jerry Sags
Championship Wrestling International
CWI Tag Team Championship (1 time) – with Jerry Sags
Continental Wrestling Association
AWA Southern Tag Team Championship (2 times) – with Jerry Sags
NWA Florida
FCW Tag Team Championship (5 times) – with Jerry Sags
North American Wrestling Association / South Atlantic Pro Wrestling
NAWA/SAPW Tag Team Championship (1 time) – with Jerry Sags
Pro Wrestling Illustrated
PWI Tag Team of the Year award in 1994 – with Jerry Sags.
PWI ranked him # 409 of the 500 best singles wrestlers during the "PWI Years" in 2003.
PWI ranked him # 53 of the 100 best tag teams of the "PWI Years" with Jerry Sags in 2003.
Professional Wrestling Federation
PWF Tag Team Championship (1 time) – with Jerry Sags
World Championship Wrestling
WCW Hardcore Championship (3 times)
WCW World Tag Team Championship (3 times) – with Jerry Sags
World Wrestling Federation
WWF Tag Team Championship (1 time) – with Jerry Sags
X Wrestling Federation
XWF World Tag Team Championship (1 time) – with Jerry Sags
Yankee Pro Wrestling
YPW Heavyweight Championship (1 time)

References

External links
Brian Knobbs biography at Accelerator3359

1964 births
20th-century professional wrestlers
21st-century professional wrestlers
Living people
American male professional wrestlers
Sportspeople from Allentown, Pennsylvania
The First Family (professional wrestling) members
Whitehall High School (Pennsylvania) alumni
Professional wrestlers from Pennsylvania
NWA Florida Tag Team Champions
WCW World Tag Team Champions
New World Order (professional wrestling) members